The 2021 Penrith Panthers season is the 55th season in the club's history. Coached by Ivan Cleary and co-captained by Nathan Cleary and Isaah Yeo, the Panthers are competing in the National Rugby League's 2021 Telstra Premiership. After the Panthers round 2 victory against the Canterbury-Bankstown Bulldogs the Panthers become the first team in NRL history to win the opening two rounds holding the opposition to nil as well as the first team to hold the opposition to nil in three regular season games in a row. Due to COVID-19 restrictions, Bluebet stadium was reduced to a capacity of 14,077 in rounds 1 and 3; after this in round 5 further lifting of restrictions meant that a crowd of 20,890 would be allowed into the stadium. This large crowd, however, was short-lived as Panthers misunderstood the new COVID restrictions, meaning tickets for the hills were oversold. From round 7 onwards the new capacity would be 16,110 until restrictions eased further. After round 12 was completed, the NSW and Queensland state of origin sides were announced for game one, where a record 7 Panthers were selected to represent their state. As a consequence, in round 13 Penrith would have to play without 7 of their stars and 3 debutants for the club. After 27 straight regular season wins and 12 straight to start the season, the win streak was broken, losing 26–6 against rivals the Wests Tigers. Penrith finished second overall at the end of the regular season and went on to play South Sydney in the first week of the finals series. They would go on to lose 10 - 16 but after wins against the Parramatta Eels (8 - 6) and Melbourne Storm (6 - 10) they would set up a rematch against the Rabbitohs. In the grand final Penrith were the eventual Premiers winning 14 - 12, their third title and first since 2003.

Squad

Player transfers
A † denotes that the transfer occurred during the 2021 season.

Fixtures

Pre-season

Regular season

TBA = To be announced
 Round 10 attendance refers to the total attendance on day 3 of magic round 
 Round 16 was played without crowds due to the June outbreak and lockdown in NSW
 Round 20 and 21 was played without crowds due to lockdown in QLD

Finals

Bracket

Ladder

Other teams
In addition to competing in the National Rugby League, the Panthers are also fielding semi-professional teams in the 2021 Jersey Flegg Cup (for players aged under 21) and the New South Wales Rugby League's The Knock-On Effect NSW Cup (NSW Cup).

Representative honours

Domestic

References 

Penrith Panthers seasons
Penrith Panthers season